The Trapped Equity Theory explains the application of cash flows that are freed up and in excess of the company's requirements, arising from the over subscription of its shares during a public offer. According to the theory, such 'trapped' excess funds could be invested to guarantee an increase in market value to shareholders over and above their wealth would increase if the 'surplus' funds were to be returned to them. 
 
Legally, the law stipulates that all surplus funds arising from over subscription of shares must be returned to the applicant and specifies sanctions for contraventions. According to the applicable law, any delay in the return of these funds must attract interest above the Central bank's re-discount rate.

However, a company may apply for its use, such excess funds from oversubscribed issues (maximum 25%) under the following conditions;
 The company obtains a prior approval of the Board of Directors/members.
 The authorized share capital can absorb the over-subscribed shares; and
 It obtains a prior approval from Securities and Exchange Commission for such absorption.

References
Pathfinder, Institute of Chartered Accountant of Nigeria (ICAN), November, 2006.
Onime, Bright Enakhe — Lesson Notes on Strategic Financial Management, May, 2010.

Corporate finance